Veronika Galušková (born 30 July 1998) is a Czech handballer who plays for DHC Slavia Prague and the Czech Republic national team.

References

1996 births
Living people
Sportspeople from Plzeň
Czech female handball players
21st-century Czech women